The Public Relations Society of America (PRSA) is a nonprofit trade association for public relations professionals. It was founded in 1947 by combining the American Council on Public Relations and the National Association of Public Relations Councils. That year, it had its first annual conference and award ceremony. In the 1950s and 1960s, the society created its code of conduct, accreditation program and a student society called the Public Relations Student Society of America.

History

The Public Relations Society of America was formed in 1947 by combining the American Council on Public Relations and the National Association of Public Relations Councils. The society had its first annual conference in Philadelphia, where Richard Falk was given PRSA's first "annual citation" for advancing the field of public relations. Several ethical violations in the field led to discussions about ethics within the society. At the 1952 annual conference, a speaker used Adolf Hitler as an example of the potential abuse of communications. The society published its first code of conduct and its first Anvil awards two years later. The code of conduct was later ratified in 1959 and again in 1963. PRSA merged with the American Public Relations Association in 1961 and started its accreditation program for public relations professionals the next year. The Public Relations Student Society of America (PRSSA) was created in 1967 based on suggestions by Professor Walter Seifer of Ohio State University.

In the 1970s to early 1980s, PRSA's female membership base increased, coinciding with more women pursuing a career in the field. PRSA had its first female President in 1972 and a second female President in 1983. In 1981, 78 percent of PRSA's student society were women, up from 38 percent in 1968. The society grew to 9,000 members by 1981, up from 4,500 members in 1960. In 1977, the Federal Trade Commission (FTC) said PRSA's code of conduct inhibited fair competition by requiring members not to solicit clients from other members. It issued a consent order that required PRSA to remove content from its code of conduct that contained sexist language, discouraged soliciting clients from other members or encouraged price-fixing activities. PRSA's first definition of public relations was created in 1982 as "Public relations helps an organization and its publics adapt mutually to each other.” In 1986, PRSA's then President Anthony Franco resigned from his post after it was revealed he was accused of insider trading by the U.S. Securities and Exchange Commission. The PRSA's philanthropy arm, the PRSA Foundation, was founded in 1990.

In 1994 O'Dwyer from the O'Dwyer's PR trade journal alleged that PRSA was violating copyright laws by lending articles from USA Today, The New York Times, O'Dwyer's and others to members. Although O'Dwyer has been a critic of PRSA since the 1970s, this is often considered the beginning of a long-term dispute between PRSA and O'Dwyer that PR News described as a "never-ending back-and-forth." In 1996 and 2011 O'Dwyer criticized PRSA on issues such as financial transparency, auditing and spending in the context of proposed increases in membership dues. PRSA said the increases were caused by an increase in services to members.

In 2000, PRSA and the Institute of Public Relations signed a mutual declaration saying the two would work together in areas like ethics, education, accreditation, professional development and new media. The society started two efforts to revise its definition of public relations in 2003 and 2007, but neither moved forward. In November 2011, PRSA led an initiative called Public Relations Defined, in order to create a crowd-sourced definition of public relations. 927 submissions were made on PRSA's website filling in the blanks to the statement: "Public relations (does what) with or for (whom) to (do what) for (what purpose).” The winning definition was: "a strategic communication process that builds mutually beneficial relationships between organisations and their bodies." According to the Chartered Institute of Public Relations (CIPR) "reactions to the new PRSA definition were mixed and views vigorously debated."

In 2011 PRSA publicized accusations that O'Dwyer had been eavesdropping on PRSA's conference calls. Later that year PRSA started refusing O'Dwyer entrance to their events and sent a 23-page letter to O'Dwyer describing his behavior as disruptive and unethical. The National Press Club tried to negotiate his entrance unsuccessfully.

Organization
 
PRSA is organized as a 501(c)(6) not-for-profit organization and governed by a set of bylaws. A chair is nominated each year and elected based on a vote of the Leadership Assembly. The Leadership Assembly consists of one delegate for every 100 members, as well as anyone that holds an elected office. Elected positions within PRSA are held on a volunteer-basis. A board of directors can propose membership fee changes that must be approved by the assembly. The board has the authority to create or dissolve task forces and committees as well as revoke or reward membership status. PRSA's Board of Ethics and Professional Standards and the Universal Accreditation Board make recommendations on the code of conduct and accreditation programs respectively. PRSA has more than 100 chapters in ten districts, nearly 375 student chapters and 14 interest groups.

Since the 1970s, the PRSA had restricted the right to sit in the group's national assembly or to seek election to the national board to those possessing an APR certification. The requirement for the assembly was dropped in 2004, but was maintained for those seeking board membership. In 2010 a revolt led by Richard Edelman and a group calling itself "the Committee for a Democratic PRSA" called for the restriction to be scrapped. The attempt to overturn the rule was defeated in a vote during that year's session of the assembly. In 2003 a proposal to amend the society's bylaws to allow non-accredited professionals to run for PRSA's offices was defeated, but the motion passed the following year.

Services
PRSA members receive access to a suite of tools that fosters professional development and career growth. PRSA is a member of the Universal Accreditation Board (UAB) which hosts an accreditation program called APR (accreditation in public relations) that evaluates a PR professional in four categories: research, planning, implementation and evaluation. Accreditation is usually granted to candidates with five to seven years of experience upon completion of written and oral examinations. About 20 percent of PRSA's members are accredited. PRSA hosts the Anvil awards, which are issued based on four components: research, planning, execution and evaluation. The Gold Anvil is awarded to individuals. The Silver Anvil is awarded for strategy and the Bronze for tactics. It also issues awards such as Grand Gold Pick, Rookie of the Year, Lifetime Achievement and PR person of the year.

PRSA's Public Relations Journal was published from October 1945 to 1995. Its original mission statement was "to carry articles that deal with fundamental public relations problems, as they currently press for solution." The journal was comparable to a text-heavy academic periodical. PRSA still publishes The Strategist and Tactics. The Strategist is a quarterly glossy magazine intended for executives, while Tactics is a monthly news tabloid.

The Public Relations Society of America publishes a code of ethics. Members that violate the code may have their membership revoked, usually under its mandate that members "not engage in any practice which tends to corrupt the integrity of channels of public communication" and that members act "in accord with public welfare." The code also expects PRSA members to identify the source of their communications, avoid derogatory methods and avoid abusing insider information. According to the code of conduct, members should "protect and advance the free flow of accurate and truthful information; foster informed decision-making through open communication... and work to strengthen the public's trust in the profession." The code states that members "adhere to the highest standards of accuracy and truth." A story in CBS criticized the code: "Show me a PR person who is 'accurate' and 'truthful,' and I'll show you a PR person who is unemployed." The code of ethics has been revised in 1954, 1959, 1963, 1977, 1983, 1988 and 2000.

Research and advocacy
The Public Relations Society of America and the Association for Education in Journalism and Mass Communication commissioned studies in 1975 and 1987 on the state of public relations in education. They found that too many classes were taught by educators with little or no experience in the field and that most didn't have a post-graduate degree. Several standards in education were established by the studies, including that 75 percent of coursework for PR professionals be outside the major. In 1991, PRSA hosted a Task Force on the Structure and Role on Public Relations, which found that public relations teachers still lacked practical experience. In 1993 PRSA published a Professional Career Guide, which classified skills and knowledge that were needed at five different levels of someone's career. PRSA also advocates that MBA programs include communications programs, so business executives will be more prepared for a crisis.

PRSA advocates for the trust, credibility and respect of public relations as a profession, believing that PR can facilitate open communication that allows for an informed public and supports the democratic process.  In 1999, a National Credibility Index from PRSA found that PR professionals were among the least credible of professions as a spokesperson. The PRSA objected to the actions of the Redner Group in 2011, when the PR firm threatened to blacklist media that gave Duke Nukem negative reviews. In 2012 a Senate subcommittee investigated the communications and advertising spend of eleven government agencies. PRSA opposed the investigation, presenting that the effort dismissed the value of public relations in government.

See also
 Canadian Public Relations Society
 Fellow of the PRSA
 Public Relations Journal

References

External links
 
 Strategies and Tactics  publication

Business organizations based in the United States
Non-profit organizations based in New York City
Professional associations based in the United States
Public relations in the United States